The 2014–15 Scottish Cup was the 130th season of Scotland's most prestigious football knockout competition. The tournament was sponsored by bookmaker William Hill in what was the fourth season of a five-year partnership.

The defending champions were St Johnstone, who defeated Dundee United in the 2014 final, but were eventually knocked out in the fifth round by Queen of the South.

Format and calendar
22 clubs entered at a preliminary round: two from the Highland League, five from the Lowland League, four qualifying Junior clubs and eleven other clubs affiliated with the Scottish Football Association. Six of these clubs were given byes to the first round, when 14 Highland League clubs, six Lowland League clubs and 2 other clubs with National Club Licensing approval enter.

In the second round, all 10 Scottish League Two clubs entered, along with the top two clubs from the previous season's Highland League, the top two clubs from the previous season's Lowland League and the 18 winners of the first round ties. All 10 Scottish League One clubs and six Scottish Championship clubs started in the third round, while the remaining four Championship clubs and all 12 Scottish Premiership clubs entered in the fourth round.

The calendar for the 2014–15 competition is as follows:

Preliminary round
The preliminary round draw took place on 17 July 2014 at Commonwealth House, Glasgow.

This round is contested entirely by non-league clubs:
 Two clubs from the Highland Football League (Cove Rangers and Fort William);
 Five clubs from the Lowland Football League (Dalbeattie Star, Edinburgh City, Edinburgh University, Gala Fairydean Rovers and Vale of Leithen);
 Eleven clubs from the South of Scotland League, East of Scotland League and other leagues (Burntisland Shipyard, Civil Service Strollers, Coldstream, Girvan, Glasgow University, Golspie Sutherland, Hawick Royal Albert, Lothian Thistle HV, Newton Stewart, St Cuthbert Wanderers, Wigtown & Bladnoch); and
 Four qualifiers from the Scottish Junior Football Association (Auchinleck Talbot, Bo'ness United, Culter and Hurlford United)

Six clubs were given byes to the first round (Bo'ness United, Coldstream, Culter, Dalbeattie Star, Girvan and Golspie Sutherland).

Replays

First round
The first round draw took place on 19 August 2014 at Stirling Management Centre, University of Stirling.

This round is contested entirely by non-league clubs:

Replay

Second round
The second round draw took place on 15 September 2014 at 2pm at Hampden Park.

This round is contested entirely by all the round 1 winners, the top 2 from last season's Lowland & Highland leagues & all those clubs competing in Scottish League Two:

Replays

Third round
The third round draw took place on 6 October 2014 at 2pm at the Usher Hall, Edinburgh.

This round is contested entirely by all the round 2 winners, all those clubs currently competing in Scottish League One & clubs currently competing in the Scottish Championship with the 6 lowest places from last season.

Replays

Fourth round
The fourth round draw took place on 3 November 2014 at 2pm at Hampden Park, Glasgow live on Sky Sports News HQ.

This round was contested entirely by all the round 3 winners, the clubs currently competing in Scottish Championship with the 4 highest places from last season & all clubs currently competing in the Scottish Premiership.

Replays

Fifth round
The fifth round draw took place on 1 December 2014 at 2pm at Hampden Park, Glasgow live on Sky Sports News HQ.

This round is contested entirely by all the round 4 winners.

Replay

Quarter-finals
The quarter-final draw took place on 9 February 2015 at 2pm at Hampden Park, Glasgow live on Sky Sports News HQ.

This round is contested entirely by all the round 5 winners.

Replay

Semi-finals
The semi-final draw took place on 8 March 2015 at Tannadice Park, Dundee live on Sky Sports 1 following the Dundee United v Celtic quarter-final.

This round is contested entirely by all the quarter-final winners & matches will take place at Hampden Park.

Final

Media coverage
From round four onwards, selected matches from the Scottish Cup are broadcast live in Ireland and the UK by BBC Scotland and Sky Sports. BBC Scotland has the option to show one tie per round with Sky Sports showing two ties per round with one replay also, Sky Sports show both semi-finals live with one also on BBC Scotland & both channels screen the final live.

These matches were broadcast live on television.

References

External links
Official website
Format and dates

Scottish Cup seasons
1
Scottish Cup